Now That's What I Call Country Volume 4 is an album from the Now! series released in the United States on June 14, 2011.

Track listing

Reception

Steve Leggett of Allmusic believes the fourth installment of the Now That's What I Call Country series proves that contemporary country radio is "filling the void that used to be occupied by classic pop and rock songs." The value of this collection and others in the series is that they zero in on a very specific period of time, "making a little music box of memories for that unique and fleeting moment in time."

Charts

Weekly charts

Year-end charts

References

Country 04
Country music compilation albums
2011 compilation albums